Sir Samuel Alexander Mendes  (born 1 August 1965) is a British film and stage director, producer, and screenwriter. In 2000, Mendes was appointed a CBE for his services to drama, and he was knighted in the 2020 New Years Honours List. That same year, he was awarded the Shakespeare Prize by the Alfred Toepfer Foundation in Hamburg, Germany. In 2005, he received a lifetime achievement award from the Directors Guild of Great Britain. In 2008, The Daily Telegraph ranked him number 15 in their list of the "100 most powerful people in British culture".

Born in Berkshire to a Trinidadian Catholic father and an English Jewish mother, Mendes grew up in North London. He read English at Peterhouse at Cambridge University, and began directing plays there before joining Donmar Warehouse, which became a centre of 1990s London theatre culture. In theatre, he is known for his dark re-inventions of the stage musicals Cabaret (1993), Oliver! (1994), Company (1995), and Gypsy (2003).

He directed an original West End stage musical for the first time with Charlie and the Chocolate Factory (2013). For his work on the London stage, Mendes has received three Laurence Olivier Awards for Company, Twelfth Night and The Ferryman and for his work on Broadway he has earned two Tony Awards for Best Direction of a Play for his work on The Ferryman in 2019, and The Lehman Trilogy in 2022.

In film, he made his directorial debut with the drama American Beauty (1999), which earned him the Academy Award and Golden Globe Award for Best Director. He has since directed the crime film Road to Perdition (2002), Jarhead (2005), the drama Revolutionary Road (2008), and the James Bond films Skyfall (2012) and Spectre (2015). For the war film 1917 (2019), he received the BAFTA Award and Golden Globe Award for Best Director, as well as his second Academy Award nominations for Best Director, Best Picture and Best Original Screenplay.

Early life 
Mendes was born on 1 August 1965 in Reading, Berkshire. He is the son of Valerie Mendes (born Barnett), a publisher and author, and Jameson Peter Mendes, a university professor. His father is a Roman Catholic of Portuguese descent from Trinidad and Tobago, and his mother is an English Jew. His grandfather was the Trinidadian writer Alfred Hubert Mendes.

Mendes's parents divorced when he was three years old, after which Mendes and his mother settled in Primrose Hill in North London. He attended Primrose Hill Primary School and was in the same class as future Foreign Secretary David Miliband and author Zoë Heller. In 1976, the family relocated to Woodstock near Oxford, where Mendes's mother found work as a senior editor at Oxford University Press. Mendes was educated at Magdalen College School where he met future theatre designer Tom Piper, who went on to work with Mendes on a National Theatre revival of Harold Pinter's The Birthday Party.

Mendes had an early interest in cinema and applied to the University of Warwick (then the only university in the UK that offered an undergraduate film course), but was turned down. He was then accepted by Peterhouse, Cambridge, where he graduated with first-class honours in English. Having developed a passion for theatre only in his late teens, Mendes became a member of the Marlowe Society at Cambridge and directed several plays. His first play was David Halliwell's Little Malcolm and His Struggle Against the Eunuchs, and one of his later productions was Cyrano de Bergerac with Tom Hollander and Jonathan Cake among the cast members. During his time at Cambridge, Mendes also became enthusiastic about cinema in earnest. He cited Paris, Texas, Repo Man and True Stories as three "seminal film moments" that influenced his stage and film career.

Mendes was noted as a "brilliant schoolboy cricketer" by Wisden Cricketers' Almanack, scoring 1,153 runs at 46 and taking 83 wickets at under 16 for Magdalen College School in 1983 and 1984. He also played cricket for Cambridge University Cricket Club, and in 1997 played for Shipton-under-Wychwood in the final of the Village Cricket Cup, the only winner of the Academy Award for Best Director to have played at Lord's.

Stage career

Early work 
After graduating from Cambridge in 1987, Mendes was hired as assistant director at the Chichester Festival Theatre. In September 1987, Mendes made his professional directing debut with a double bill of two Anton Chekhov plays, The Bear and The Proposal. In 1989, he was appointed the inaugural director of the Minerva Theatre.

In 1989, following the abrupt departure of director Robin Phillips, Mendes took over a production of Dion Boucicault's London Assurance at Chichester. Later that year, Mendes made his West End debut at the Aldwych with a production of Chekhov's The Cherry Orchard, starring Judi Dench. London Assurance then transferred to the West End following a six-month run at Chichester, opening at the Theatre Royal Haymarket. The successes of the plays established Mendes as a theatre director of national renown.

Donmar Warehouse (1990–2002) 
In 1990, Mendes was appointed artistic director of the Donmar Warehouse, a Covent Garden studio space previously used by the Royal Shakespeare Company. He spent two years overseeing the redesign of the theatre, which formally opened in 1992 with the British premiere of Stephen Sondheim's Assassins. Mendes's tenure at the Donmar saw its transformation into one of the most successful and fashionable playhouses in London.

In 1993, Mendes staged an acclaimed revival of John Kander and Fred Ebb's Cabaret starring Jane Horrocks as Sally Bowles and Alan Cumming as Emcee. The production was approached with a fresh concept, differing greatly from both the original 1966 production directed by Harold Prince and the famed film version, directed by Bob Fosse. This production opened at the Donmar and received four Olivier Award nominations including Best Musical Revival, before transferring promptly to Broadway where it played for several years at the Kit Kat Club (i.e. the Stephen Sondheim Theater). The Broadway cast included Cumming once again as Emcee, with Natasha Richardson as Sally, Mary Louise Wilson as Fraulein Schneider, John Benjamin Hickey as Cliff, and Ron Rifkin as Herr Schultz. Cumming, Richardson, and Rifkin all won Tony Awards for their performances.

1994 saw Mendes stage a new production of Lionel Bart's Oliver!, produced by Cameron Mackintosh. Mendes, a longtime fan of the work, worked in close collaboration with Bart and other production team members, William David Brohn, Martin Koch and Anthony Ward, to create a fresh staging of the well-known classic. Bart added new musical material and Mendes updated the book slightly, while the orchestrations were radically rewritten to suit the show's cinematic feel. The cast included Jonathan Pryce (after much persuasion) as Fagin, Sally Dexter as Nancy, and Miles Anderson as Bill Sikes. Mendes, Pryce and Dexter received Olivier Award nominations for their work on Oliver!.

Mendes also directed productions of David Hare's The Blue Room in 1998, starring Nicole Kidman; Richard Greenberg's Three Days of Rain in 1999, with Colin Firth, David Morrissey and Elizabeth McGovern; as well as his farewell duo in 2002, Chekhov's Uncle Vanya and Twelfth Night, both headed by Simon Russell Beale, Helen McCrory, Emily Watson and Mark Strong. He stepped down as artistic director of the Donmar in December 2002 and was succeeded by Michael Grandage.

After the Donmar (2002–present) 
In 2003, Mendes directed a revival of the musical Gypsy. Originally, he planned to stage this production in London's West End with an eventual Broadway transfer, but when negotiations fell through, he brought it to New York. The cast included Bernadette Peters as Rose, Tammy Blanchard as Louise and John Dossett as Herbie.

Mendes also directed the 2013 Olivier Award-nominated stage adaptation of Roald Dahl's Charlie and the Chocolate Factory which ran in London's West End until January 2017. It starred Douglas Hodge as Willy Wonka, followed by Alex Jennings and Jonathan Slinger who later took over the role.

In 2014, Mendes directed Simon Russell Beale in King Lear by William Shakespeare at the National Theatre, London. Mendes directed Jez Butterworth's The Ferryman for the Royal Court Theatre in London in 2017, before transferring to the West End later that year and Broadway in 2018, for which he won an Olivier Award and Tony Award for Best Director.

In 2018, Mendes directed The Lehman Trilogy by Stefano Massini in an English adaptation by Ben Power for the National Theatre, London starring Simon Russell Beale, Adam Godley and Ben Miles. In 2019 the play played a season at the Park Avenue Armory in New York before returning for another London season in the West End. The play made its Broadway transfer in 2020 briefly but was stalled due to the Covid pandemic. The play resumed performances in 2021 and went on to receive eight Tony Award nominations winning five awards including Best Play and Best Director of a Play.

Film career

American Beauty to Away We Go (1999–2009) 
In 1999, Mendes made his film directorial debut with American Beauty, starring Kevin Spacey. He had been approached by Steven Spielberg, who was impressed by his productions of Oliver! and Cabaret. The film grossed $356.3 million worldwide. The film won the Golden Globe Award, the BAFTA Award and the Academy Award for Best Picture. Mendes won the Golden Globe Award, Directors Guild of America Award, and the Academy Award for Best Director, becoming the sixth director to earn the Academy Award for his feature film debut.

Mendes's second film, in 2002, was Road to Perdition, which grossed US$181 million. The aggregate review score on Rotten Tomatoes is currently 81%; critics praised Paul Newman for his performance. The film was nominated for six Academy Awards, including Best Supporting Actor for Newman; it won for Best Cinematography.

In 2003, Mendes established Neal Street Productions, a film, television and theatre production company he would use to finance much of his later work. In 2005, Mendes directed the war film Jarhead, in association with his production company Neal Street Productions. The film received mixed reviews, with a Rotten Tomatoes rating of 61%, and a gross revenue of US$96.9 million worldwide. The film focused on the boredom and other psychological challenges of wartime.

In 2008, Mendes directed Revolutionary Road, starring his then-wife, Kate Winslet, along with Leonardo DiCaprio and Kathy Bates. In a January 2009 interview, Mendes commented, about directing his wife for the first time, "I would open my eyes in the morning and there Kate would be, going, 'Great! You're awake! Now let's talk about the second scene.'" Mendes's comedy-drama Away We Go opened the 2009 Edinburgh International Film Festival. The film follows a couple (John Krasinski, Maya Rudolph) searching North America for the perfect community in which to settle down and start a family. The film was well received by critics but performed poorly at the box office.

In 2010, Mendes co-produced a critically acclaimed documentary film Out of the Ashes that deals with cricket in Afghanistan. On 5 January 2010, news broke that Mendes was employed to direct the 23rd Eon Productions instalment of the James Bond franchise. The film, Skyfall, was subsequently released on 26 October 2012, to coincide with the 50th anniversary of the Bond films. Mendes had been employed as a consultant on the film when it was in pre-production, and had remained attached to the project during the financial troubles of MGM. The film was a major critical and commercial success, becoming the 14th film to gross over $1 billion worldwide.

In 2012, Mendes's Neal Street Productions produced the first series of the BBC One drama series, Call the Midwife, following it with a second season which began transmission in early 2013.

Skyfall to 1917 to Empire of Light (2013–present) 
After the success of Skyfall, Mendes was asked if he was returning to direct the next Bond film. He responded, "I felt I put everything I possibly could into this film and it was the Bond film I wanted to make. And if I felt I could do the same again, then absolutely I would consider doing another one. But it is a big task and I wouldn't do it unless I knew I could." It was reported that one reason Mendes was reluctant to commit was that one proposal involved making two films back-to-back, based on an idea by Skyfall writer John Logan, which would have resulted in Mendes and other creative personnel being tied up with filming for around four years. It was reported in February 2013 that this idea had since been shelved and that the next two films would be stand-alone. Mendes said in an interview with film magazine Empire in March 2013 that "it has been a very difficult decision not to accept Michael and Barbara's very generous offer to direct the next Bond movie." He cited, amongst other reasons, his commitments to the stage version of Charlie and the Chocolate Factory and King Lear.

However, on 29 May 2013, it was reported that Mendes was back in negotiations with producers Michael G. Wilson and Barbara Broccoli to direct the next Bond film, going back on his previous comments. Wilson and Broccoli were willing to postpone production of the film to ensure Mendes's participation. On 11 July 2013, it was announced that Mendes would direct the 24th James Bond film, Spectre; it was released in October 2015. This made him the first filmmaker since John Glen to direct two Bond films in a row. In April 2016, Mendes was named as the President of the Jury for the 73rd Venice International Film Festival.

Mendes's next film, war epic 1917, was released by Universal Pictures on 25 December 2019 in the US and on 10 January 2020 in the UK. Based in part on an account told to Mendes by his paternal grandfather, Alfred Mendes, it chronicles the story of two young British soldiers in the spring of 1917 at a critical point during World War I. Mendes went on to win the Golden Globe Award for Best Director for his achievement in directing and in his acceptance speech saluted his grandfather, as well as acknowledging the contribution to cinema of fellow nominee Martin Scorsese. On 25 January 2020, he won the Directors Guild of America Award for Outstanding Directing – Feature Film, following which he was installed by the press as the favourite to win the Academy Award for Best Director at the then approaching 92nd Academy Awards. However that plaudit went instead to Bong Joon-ho for the South Korean film Parasite. The two directors had shared the honours for directing at the 25th Critics' Choice Awards several weeks prior.

In 2021, it was announced that Mendes's next feature would be Empire of Light starring Olivia Colman.

Personal life 
Mendes and actress Kate Winslet met in 2001, when Mendes approached her about appearing in a play at the Donmar Warehouse, where he was then artistic director. They married in May 2003, on what they characterised as a whim, while on holiday in Anguilla when Winslet was two months pregnant with their child. Their son was born on 22 December 2003 in New York City. Mendes also had a stepdaughter from Winslet's first marriage to filmmaker Jim Threapleton.

Amid intense media speculation of an affair between Mendes and actress Rebecca Hall, he and Winslet announced their separation in 2010 and divorced in 2011. Mendes and Hall were in a relationship from 2011 to 2013. Mendes married trumpeter Alison Balsom in January 2017. Their daughter was born in September 2017.

Mendes was appointed a Knight Bachelor in the 2020 New Years Honours List for services to drama.

In 2009, Mendes signed a petition in support of film director Roman Polanski, calling for his release after Polanski was arrested in Switzerland in relation to his 1977 charge for drugging and raping a 13-year-old girl.

Mendes is an opponent of Brexit. In 2017, he stated: "I'm afraid that the winds that were blowing before the First World War are blowing again. There was this generation of men fighting then for a free and unified Europe, which we would do well to remember."

Favourite films 
In 2012, Mendes participated in the Sight & Sound film polls of that year. Held every ten years to select the greatest films of all time, contemporary directors were asked to select ten films of their choice.

 The 400 Blows (France, 1959)
 Blue Velvet (USA, 1986)
 Citizen Kane (USA, 1941)
 Fanny and Alexander (Sweden, 1984)
 The Godfather Part II (USA, 1974)
 Kes (UK, 1969)
 Rosemary's Baby (USA, 1968)
 Taxi Driver (USA, 1976)
 There Will Be Blood (USA, 2007)
 Vertigo (USA, 1958)

Filmography

Film
Director

Producer
 Things We Lost in the Fire

Executive producer
 Starter for 10 (2006)
 The Kite Runner (2007)
 Out of the Ashes (2010) (Documentary)
 Blood (2012)

Television
Executive producer

Awards and honours

References

Bibliography

External links 

 
 Charlie Rose interview 5 June 2009
 Brandon Kosters interview 2 June 2009
 The Observer Interview 14 December 2008
 

1965 births
Living people
People from Reading, Berkshire
English expatriates in the United States
People educated at Magdalen College School, Oxford
Alumni of Peterhouse, Cambridge
English people of Jewish descent
English people of Italian descent
English people of Portuguese descent
English people of Trinidad and Tobago descent
English theatre directors
English film directors
Drama Desk Award winners
Filmmakers who won the Best Film BAFTA Award
Helpmann Award winners
Laurence Olivier Award winners
Tony Award winners
Best Directing Academy Award winners
Best Director BAFTA Award winners
Best Director Golden Globe winners
Commanders of the Order of the British Empire
Critics' Circle Theatre Award winners
English Jews
British Jews
Directors Guild of America Award winners
English-language film directors
Action film directors
Knights Bachelor
Jewish theatre directors